Thomas Bagge (30 April 1838 – 23 October 1908) was an English cricketer. He played thirteen first-class matches for Cambridge University Cricket Club between 1859 and 1862.

See also
 List of Cambridge University Cricket Club players

References

External links
 

1838 births
1908 deaths
English cricketers
Cambridge University cricketers
Sportspeople from Norfolk
Marylebone Cricket Club cricketers
Gentlemen cricketers